David Beattie (born 23 August 1903) was a Scottish footballer who played for Clydebank and Dumbarton.

References

1903 births
Scottish footballers
Dumbarton F.C. players
Clydebank F.C. (1914) players
Scottish Football League players
Year of death missing
New Brighton A.F.C. players
Association football wing halves